Mayes Castillero Rubeo (born 1962) is a Mexican costume designer. She is known for her work on the films Apocalypto (2006), Avatar (2009), John Carter (2012), World War Z (2013), Warcraft (2016), Thor: Ragnarok (2017) and Jojo Rabbit (2019), the lattermost of which earned her Academy Award and BAFTA Award nominations.

Life and career
Rubeo was born Mayes Castillero in Mexico City, in 1962. She studied in Guadalajara Higschool José Guadalupe Zuno Hernández. She moved from Mexico City to Los Angeles in the 1980s, where she attended Los Angeles Trade Tech. After graduating, she moved to Italy to work with Italian Costume Designer Enrico Sabbatini. To this day, Rubeo maintains a workshop in Italy.

She got her start in Hollywood working as a costume designer for John Sayles (Men With Guns, Sunshine State). In 2006, she was engaged as a costume designer for Mel Gibson's Apocalypto. Three years later she worked with James Cameron on Avatar, for which she was nominated for the Costume Designers Guild Award in the Excellence in Fantasy Film category.

Rubeo received Academy Award and BAFTA Award nominations for best costume design in Jojo Rabbit.

Rubeo received a Primetime Emmy Awards nomination and win for Outstanding Fantasy/Sci-Fi Costumes for her work in WandaVision.

She received the Artistry in Filmmaking Award at the 2021 Coronado Island Film Festival.

Personal life
Mayes Rubeo was married to the Italian production designer Bruno Rubeo until his death in 2011. Their son is an art director.

Filmography
 The Arrival (1996)
 Men with Guns (1997)
 Inferno (1999)
 Warden of Red Rock (2001)
 Fidel (2002)
 Sunshine State (2002)
 Casa de los babys (2003)
 The Librarian – Quest for the Spear (2004)
 Apocalypto (2006)
 Dragonball Evolution (2009)
 Avatar (2009)
 John Carter (2012)
 World War Z (2013)
 Warcraft (2016)
 The Great Wall (2016)
 Thor: Ragnarok (2017)
 Jojo Rabbit (2019)
 WandaVision (2021)
 Thor: Love and Thunder (2022)
 Werewolf by Night (2022)
 Blue Beetle (2023)
 Deadpool 3 (2024)

References

External links
 Mayes C Rubio Costume Designer Reel  (2013)
 

Mexican costume designers
Living people
Women costume designers
People from Mexico City
People from Los Angeles
1962 births